The 1993 Tournament of the Americas, later known as the FIBA Americas Championship and the FIBA AmeriCup, was a basketball championship hosted by Puerto Rico from August 28 to September 5, 1993.  The games were played in San Juan.  This FIBA AmeriCup was to earn the four berths allocated to the Americas for the 1994 FIBA World Championship in Toronto.  The United States defeated Puerto Rico in the final to win the tournament, although they had already qualified for the World Championship by winning the 1992 Summer Olympics basketball tournament.  Argentina defeated Brazil in the third place game. Cuba defeated Venezuela in 5th place game. All five nations qualified for the 1994 FIBA World Championship.

Qualification
Eight teams qualified during the qualification tournaments held in their respective zones in 1993; USA and Canada qualified automatically since they are the only two members of the North America zone.
North America: , 
Caribbean and Central America:, 

The draw split the tournament into two groups:
 
Group A

 
Group B

Format
The top four teams from each group advance to the knockout round. The losers from the knockout quarterfinals compete in a separate bracket to define fifth through eighth place.
The winners in the knockout semifinals advanced to the Final and were granted berths in the 1994 FIBA World Championship in Canada. The losers figure in a third-place playoff and were both also granted berths in the FIBA World Championship. Since Canada and the United States were already qualified as hosts and Olympic Champions respectively, should they reach one of the top four positions in the final standings, one or two extra berths should be granted to the fifth and/or sixth team in the final standings.

Squads

Preliminary round

Group A

|}

Group B

|}

Knockout round

Championship Bracket

Classification round

5th-8th places

Awards

Final standings

References
 1993 FIBA Americas Championship for Men, FIBA.com.

FIBA AmeriCup
1993 in Puerto Rican sports
International basketball competitions hosted by Puerto Rico
1993–94 in North American basketball
1993–94 in South American basketball